Richard Ellis (born 22 May 1945) is a New Zealand cricketer. He played in fourteen first-class and five List A matches for Central Districts from 1971 to 1978.

See also
 List of Central Districts representative cricketers

References

External links
 

1945 births
Living people
New Zealand cricketers
Central Districts cricketers
Cricketers from Nelson, New Zealand